Sid Ahmed Ghozali (born 31 March 1937 in Maghnia, Algeria) is an Algerian politician who was the Prime Minister of Algeria from 1991 to 1992.

Early life 
He was a member of the National Liberation Front party and an ally of President Houari Boumedienne, under whom he served as head of Sonatrach from 1966 to 1977, when he became Minister of Energy and Industry.   He was removed from this post by the new president Chadli Bendjedid in 1979, becoming ambassador to France, but was brought back in 1988 as Minister of Finance until 1989, then foreign minister until 1991. On 5 June 1991 he succeeded Mouloud Hamrouche as Prime Minister; he remained Prime Minister following the January 1992 resignation of Bendjedid and takeover by the military, but he resigned on 8 July that year, shortly after the assassination of Mohammed Boudiaf.  He ran for president in the 1999 elections, and attempted to do so again in 2004, but was disqualified by the Constitutional Council.

References 

  Maroc-Hebdo
 L'Humanité

External links

1937 births
Living people
National Liberation Front (Algeria) politicians
People from Maghnia
Algerian expatriates in France
Energy ministers of Algeria
Finance ministers of Algeria
Foreign ministers of Algeria
Industry ministers of Algeria
21st-century Algerian people